Thomas Bowen (died 1790) was a Welsh engraver of charts. He was the son of Emanuel Bowen (1693/4–1767), map engraver to George II and Louis XV.

He died in Clerkenwell workhouse early in 1790.

Works

He engraved:

the maps and charts of the West Indies, published by the direction of the government from the surveys of Captain James Speer; 
maps of the country twenty miles round London and of the road between London and St. David's, about 1750; 
a 'New Projection of the Eastern and Western Hemispheres of the Earth,' 1776; and 
an 'Accurate Map of the Russian Empire in Europe and Asia,' 1778.
"A New & Accurate Map Of Europe From The Latest Improvements And Regulated By Astronomical Observations", engraved for Mountague's History of England.
An 'English map of Persia and the Garden of Eden,' 1780

He contributed to George Taylor and Andrew Skinner's Survey and Maps of the Roads of North Britain in 1776.

References

Attribution

Year of birth missing
1790 deaths
Welsh cartographers
Welsh engravers
18th-century engravers
18th-century cartographers
18th-century Welsh people